The final state conjecture is that the end state of the universe will consist of black holes and gravitational radiation.

References

See also 
 Black hole stability conjecture

Conjectures
Ultimate fate of the universe